San Benito County (San Benito, Spanish for "St. Benedict"), officially the County of San Benito, is a county located in the Coast Range Mountains of the U.S. state of California. As of the 2020 census, the population was 64,209. The county seat is Hollister.

San Benito County is included in the San Jose-Sunnyvale-Santa Clara, CA Metropolitan Statistical Area, which is also included in the San Jose-San Francisco-Oakland, CA Combined Statistical Area.

El Camino Real passes through the county and includes one mission in San Juan Bautista.

History
Before the arrival of the first European settlers, the San Benito County area was inhabited by the Mutsun sub-group of the Ohlone Native Americans.  In 1772 Father Juan Crespí conducted a brief expedition into the area and named a small river which he found in honor of San Benito de Nursia (Saint Benedict), the patron saint of monasticism. The county was later named after the San Benito Valley, the valley surrounding this river. Thus it was from the Spanish version of the saint's name that the county eventually took its name.

In 1797 Spanish missionaries founded the first European settlement in the county as the San Juan Bautista mission.  In 1848 the United States government gained control over what would soon become the state of California, which included the area now known as San Benito county.  The town of New Idria was the next town to develop in the area and was founded ca. 1857.  New Idria was centered around the New Idria Mercury Mine.  When the mine played out fairly recently in 1972, New Idria was abandoned, and the town is now one of California's many ghost-towns.

The town of Hollister was next founded on November 19, 1868, by William Welles Hollister on the grounds of the former Mexican land-grant Rancho San Justo. In 1874 the California legislature formed San Benito county from a section of Monterey County while naming Hollister as the new county seat.  Sections of Merced and Fresno Counties were also later reassigned to San Benito county in 1887 as a result of the growth of the New Idria community.  Other towns in the county which were founded early in the county's history include Tres Pinos and Paicines.

Geography

Sharing a border with Santa Clara County, San Benito County lies adjacent to the San Francisco Bay Area and is sometimes considered a part of that region. Frequently, the county is associated with the Monterey Bay Area through governmental organizations such as the Association of Monterey Bay Area Governments as well as the Pajaro River, which flows from northern San Benito County into the Monterey Bay.  The United States Census Bureau includes the county in the San Jose-Sunnyvale-Santa Clara MSA and the San Jose-San Francisco-Oakland CSA, which the Census uses as a statistical definition of the San Francisco Bay Area.

The county also borders Merced County and Fresno County on the east, which extend into California's San Joaquin Valley. It borders Santa Cruz County on the west and Monterey County on the southwest border.

The county is also the location of the Mount Harlan and San Benito American Viticultural Areas.  The latter contains the Cienega Valley, Lime Kiln Valley, and Paicines AVAs.

Flora
Due to the high degree of topography, diverse geology, and varied climate from near-coastal to inland, San Benito County contains a high diversity of vegetation types.  Common vegetation types include annual grasslands, coastal scrub, chaparral, and oak woodland. 

In the extreme southeastern portion of San Benito County at Panoche Valley, Panoche Hills, Tumey Hills, and Vallecitos, the climate is arid and part of the recently recognized San Joaquin Desert biome.  The flora there includes saltbush scrub, San Joaquin Desert scrub, and California juniper woodland.  Panoche Hills navarretia (Navarretia panochensis) is nearly endemic to this small portion of the San Joaquin Desert in San Benito County.   

At the highest elevations of San Benito County at Fremont Peak and San Benito Mountain, the average annual precipitation is high enough and the average annual temperature is cool enough to support mixed conifer forest.  At San Benito Mountain, the high elevation climate and extreme geology of the New Idria serpentine, supports a unique mixed-conifer forest that includes foothill pine, Coulter pine, Jeffrey pine, and incense cedar.  The extreme conditions of the serpentine soils of the New Idria serpentine mass support many rare local endemic plant species including San Benito evening primrose (Camissonia benitensis), rayless layia (Layia discoidea), Guirado's goldenrod (Solidago guiradonis), and San Benito fritillary (Fritillaria viridea).

The plant species Benitoa occidentalis was named for San Benito County. Camissonia benitensis, Monardella antonina subsp. benitensis, and Arctostaphylos benitoensis were named in recognition of their being endemic or near-endemic to San Benito County. The species Hollisteria lanata was named after William Welles Hollister, namesake of the city of Hollister.

Fauna
Illacme plenipes, a millipede having more legs than any other millipede species, discovered in the county in 1926.

National protected area
 Pinnacles National Park

Demographics

2020 census

Note: the US Census treats Hispanic/Latino as an ethnic category. This table excludes Latinos from the racial categories and assigns them to a separate category. Hispanics/Latinos can be of any race.

2011

Places by population, race, and income

2010
The 2010 United States Census reported that San Benito County had a population of 55,269. The racial makeup of San Benito County was 35,181 (63.7%) White, 483 (0.9%) African American, 895 (1.6%) Native American, 1,443 (2.6%) Asian, 94 (0.2%) Pacific Islander, 14,471 (26.2%) from other races, and 2,702 (4.9%) from two or more races. Hispanic or Latino of any race were 31,186 persons (56.4%).

2000
As of the census of 2000, there were 53,234 people, 15,885 households, and 12,898 families residing in the county.  The population density was 38 people per square mile (15/km2). There were 16,499 housing units at an average density of 12 per square mile (5/km2). The racial makeup of the county in 2010 was 38.3% non-Hispanic White, 0.6% non-Hispanic Black or African American, 0.4% Native American, 2.3% Asian, 0.1% Pacific Islander, 0.1% from other races, and 1.7% from two or more races. 56.4% of the population were Hispanic or Latino of any race. 7.6% were of German, 6.3% Irish and 5.4% Italian ancestry according to Census 2000. 62.8% spoke English and 35.3% Spanish as their first language. As of the 2010 United States Census, San Benito County was the only county in the greater San Francisco Bay Area with a Hispanic majority and where a minority race formed the largest race composition.

There were 15,885 households, out of which 46.3% had children under the age of 18 living with them, 65.7% were married couples living together, 10.5% had a female householder with no husband present, and 18.8% were non-families. 14.1% of all households were made up of individuals, and 5.4% had someone living alone who was 65 years of age or older.  The average household size was 3.32 and the average family size was 3.64.

In the county, the population was spread out, with 32.2% under the age of 18, 8.8% from 18 to 24, 31.5% from 25 to 44, 19.3% from 45 to 64, and 8.1% who were 65 years of age or older.  The median age was 31 years. For every 100 females there were 102.5 males.  For every 100 females age 18 and over, there were 99.6 males.

The median income for a household in the county was $57,469, and the median income for a family was $60,665. Males had a median income of $44,158 versus $29,524 for females. The per capita income for the county was $20,932.  About 6.7% of families and 10.0% of the population were below the poverty line, including 11.4% of those under age 18 and 8.5% of those age 65 or over.

Government and policing 

County government is overseen by a five-member elected Board of Supervisors, who serve four-year terms of office. Other elected county leaders include:

Assessor
Clerk-Auditor-Recorder
District Attorney
Sheriff-Coroner
Treasurer-Tax Collector-Public Administrator

San Benito County had the last elected Marshal in California until 2010 when the office closed. Shasta and Trinity Counties still have appointed Marshals.

State and federal representation 

Policing

The San Benito County Sheriff provides court protection, jail management, and coroner service for the entire county. It provides patrol and detective services for the unincorporated areas of the county. Hollister (the County Seat) has a municipal police department.

Politics 
San Benito is a Democratic-leaning county in Presidential and congressional elections. The last Republican to win a majority in the county was George H. W. Bush in 1988. San Benito is also considered a bellwether county for California in presidential elections; since 1904 the solitary candidate to carry the state without winning this county has been Harry S. Truman in 1948. Before 1904, however, it was a solidly Democratic county whilst the state leaned Republican, voting Democratic in every election from its creation in 1876 up to and including 1900, although California only voted Democratic in 1880 and 1892.

As of May, 2010, the California Secretary of State reports that San Benito County has 34,562 eligible voters. Of those 24,736 (71.57%) are registered voters.  Of those, 11,959 (48.35%) are registered Democratic, 7,477 (30.23%) are registered Republican, 565 (2.28%)are registered American Independent, and 116 (0.47%) are Green Party.  The two incorporated municipalities of Hollister and San Juan Bautista have Democratic majorities on their voter rolls, whereas the unincorporated areas of San Benito County have a small Republican plurality in voter registration.

Voter registration

Cities by population and voter registration

Crime 

The following table includes the number of incidents reported and the rate per 1,000 persons for each type of offense.

Cities by population and crime ratable

Economy
The economy is statistically included in metro San Jose, though the dominant activity is agriculture. Agritourism is growing as the county has destination wineries, organic farms and quaint inns with views of cattle grazing. With concerns about how oil and gas operations could impact this sector of the economy and agriculture in general, the county voters approved a measure in 2014 that bans well stimulation techniques such as fracking, acidizing and steam injection, along with conventional drilling in some areas. In the 1950s, the oil drilling industry had many wells and the county is over the Monterey Shale formation but there is very little activity now.

Top employers

According to the San Benito County Chamber of Commerce, the top employers in the county are:

Media
San Benito County receives media in Monterey County, including the major Monterey County TV and radio stations.

The county also has several media outlets that serve the local community:

Television
CMAP TV - Community Media Access Partnership, based in Gilroy, operates Channels 17, 18, 19 & 20 on Charter/Spectrum Cable as well as streaming online, offering public access and educational programming to Gilroy and San Benito County as well as offering live civic meetings, including county government.

Radio
 KMPG, at 1520 AM daytime, plays regional Mexican music;
 KQKE, at 97.5 FM, "The Quake" San Benito County Community Radio provides a low power signal.
 KHRI, at 90.7 FM, is an affiliate of Air 1 playing contemporary Christian music;
 KXSM, at 93.1 FM, broadcasts a regional Mexican format.
 K206BQ, at 89.1 FM, rebroadcasts KLVM.
 K265DG, at 100.9 FM, rebroadcasts KPRC-FM.

Print
The Hollister Free Lance, founded in 1873, is published weekly on Thursdays. The Freelance is now owned by New SV Media, Inc.and its main office is in Gilroy. New SV Media owns Good Times, Metro Silicon Valley, Pajaroan, Gilroy Dispatch, SantaCruz.com, King City Rustler and California Wheelin'.
 Mission Village Voice is a monthly paper based in San Juan Bautista. It is oriented toward arts, culture and community-wide events.

Online
 BenitoLink is a nonprofit news website covering San Benito County, run by local and regional residents.
 San Benito Live is a local news website, primarily focused on culture-related media.

Transportation

Major highways
 U.S. Route 101 to San Francisco
 State Route 25
 State Route 129 to Santa Cruz
 State Route 146
 State Route 156

Public transportation
San Benito County Express provides fixed route service in the city of Hollister, and intercity service in the northern portion of the county. Service operates as far north as Gilroy, in Santa Clara County.

Airports

Hollister Municipal Airport is a general aviation airport located just north of Hollister.

Communities

Cities
Hollister (county seat)
San Juan Bautista

Census-designated places
Aromas
Ridgemark
Tres Pinos

Unincorporated communities

Bitterwater
Dunneville
Hudner
Paicines
Panoche
River Oaks
San Benito
Tres Pinos

Ghost town
New Idria

Population ranking

The population ranking of the following table is based on the 2010 census of San Benito County.

† county seat

See also 
List of museums in the California Central Coast
National Register of Historic Places listings in San Benito County, California
George H. Moore, San Benito County district attorney

Notes

References

External links 

History of San Benito County

 

 
California counties
1874 establishments in California
Populated places established in 1874
Majority-minority counties in California